The Salvation Islands (so called because the missionaries went there to escape plague on the mainland; sometimes mistakenly called Safety Islands) are a group of small islands of volcanic origin about  off the coast of French Guiana,  north of Kourou, in the Atlantic Ocean. Although closer to Kourou, the islands are part of Cayenne  (municipality), specifically .

Geography

Islands
There are three islands, from north to south:

Climate
The climate of Salvation Islands focuses on the characteristics of Royale Island. Royale Island has a tropical savanna climate (Köppen climate classification Aw).

History
Between 1852 and 1953, the islands were part of a notorious penal colony for the worst criminals of France. The penal colony stretched along the border with Suriname. Île Royale was the reception centre for the general population of the penal colony; they were housed in moderate freedom due to the difficulty of escape from the island. Saint-Joseph Island was the Reclusion, where inmates were sent to be punished by solitary confinement in silence and darkness for escapes or offences committed in the penal colony. Devil's Island was for political prisoners. In the 19th century, the most famous such prisoner was Captain Alfred Dreyfus, held there from 1895 to 1899 after his conviction in mainland France for treason.

This penal colony was controversial given its reputation for harshness and brutality. Prisoner upon prisoner violence was common, tropical diseases killed many, and a small core of broken survivors returned to France to tell how horrible it was and scare other potential criminals. This system was gradually phased out and ended completely in 1953. Nowadays the islands are a popular tourist destination. The islands were featured in the autobiography Papillon, by Henri Charrière, who was imprisoned there for 9 years. Joseph Conrad's short story An Anarchist (1906) is largely set in Salvation Islands.

As of 1979, the Salvation Islands are protected areas managed by Conservatoire du littoral.

Gallery

References

External links
 Map
 Photos des Îles du Salut 
 Photos de Île Royale
 Photos de Île Saint-Joseph

Salut
Cayenne
Salut
Protected areas of French Guiana
Tourist attractions in French Guiana